"The Great Sleigh Drive" from December 1678 to February 1679 was a daring and bold maneuver using sleighs by Frederick William, the Great Elector of Brandenburg-Prussia, to drive Swedish forces out of the Duchy of Prussia, a territory of his which had been invaded by the Swedes in November 1678.

Background 
Frederick William had previously defeated the Swedes and driven them from Brandenburg at the Battle of Fehrbellin and now faced another punitive Swedish incursion into his territories. The main body of his army was engaged at the siege of the Swedish-held port city of Stralsund on the coast of the Baltic Sea far to the west, so Frederick marched his army to the small town of Preußisch Holland and engaged a small Swedish force occupying the city. The Swedes, having been soundly defeated at the Battle of Fehrbellin, were hesitant to face Frederick William again and decided to retreat to the coast in order to return to Sweden, having already accomplished their goal of looting much of the province and avenging their earlier defeat.

The Sleigh Drive 
Most commanders would have simply allowed the Swedes to depart, but Frederick William was particularly aggressive and came across the ingenious idea of commandeering thousands of sleighs from local peasantry to transport his army across the snowy terrain of the Duchy of Prussia to cut off the Swedes' escape route: creating, in effect, a precursor to motorised infantry. Driving over the heavy snow and several frozen lakes, Frederick managed to drive deep into the flanks and rear of the escaping Swedish force, denying them access to the coast and their navy, which would have allowed them to resupply or escape.

Aftermath 
Frederick's forces managed to ride all the way to Memel, completely cutting off the Swedes from the coast. Although the Brandenburg forces never actually managed to force the Swedes to commit to the field in an open battle as Frederick had wanted, many Swedish troops perished in the harsh winter from hypothermia and starvation, and the Swedish army was effectively destroyed. This victory cemented Frederick William's reputation as a great military strategist.

Significance 
Maneuver warfare, or as the Germans call it, Bewegungskrieg, was eventually part of a long-standing tradition of the German military.  The Winter Campaign of 1678 and the subsequent Great Sleigh Drive appeared in the German military war journal Militär-Wochenblatt in 1929, in which a (then) relatively unknown Major by the name of Heinz Guderian wrote an article commenting about its use of operational mobility as a decisive factor in victory.

Order of Battle of the Prussian defense of East Prussia

October 1678 
 Groben Infantry Battalion
 Talan Infantry Battalion
 Samland Militia Cuirassier Regiment
 Nataginsk Militia Cuirassier Regiment
 Dragoons (4 companies)

References

Bibliography 
 
 

1678 in Europe
Battles involving Brandenburg-Prussia
Battles involving Sweden
Battles involving Prussia
East Prussia
Conflicts in 1678
Conflicts in 1679
1678 in Prussia
1679 in Prussia
Scanian War
Sledding